Egüés is a municipality of Navarre, Spain, in the metropolitan area of Pamplona. Its population is 19,014.

The valley comprises several settlements, some of them are actually suburbs of Pamplona and other completely rural villages.

Gorraiz, Olaz, Alzuza, Egüés and partly also Badostain have grown as residential suburbs of single-family houses. Sarriguren is being developing as a residential suburb of apartment housing. There are also several industrial parks. Sarriguren is leading in Navarre the increasingly important sector of renewable energy technologies; it is seat of the National Center for Renewable Energies (CENER) and of Acciona Energía. The Museo Oteiza is in Alzuza.

, the direct descendant of Miguel Indurain's Banesto team, is based in Egüés.

References

External links
 Ayuntamiento del Valle de Egüés
 EGÜÉS in the Bernardo Estornés Lasa - Auñamendi Encyclopedia (Euskomedia Fundazioa) 

Municipalities in Navarre